The Atelidae are one of the five families of New World monkeys now recognised.  It was formerly included in the family Cebidae. Atelids are generally larger monkeys; the family includes the howler, spider, woolly, and woolly spider monkeys (the latter being the largest of the New World monkeys). They are found throughout the forested regions of Central and South America, from Mexico to northern Argentina.

Characteristics
The Atelidae family consists of monkeys that are small to moderate in size, usually 34 to 72 cm in head-body length, with the howler monkeys being the largest members of the group, and the spider monkeys being the smallest. They have long prehensile tails with a sensitive, almost hairless, tactile pad on the underside of the distal part. The tail is frequently used as 'fifth limb' while moving through the trees where they make their homes. They also have nails on their fingers and toes, enabling them to climb. Most species have predominantly dark brown, grey, or black fur, often with paler markings.

These are arboreal and diurnal animals, with most species restricted to dense rain forest, although some howler monkey species are found in drier forests, or wooded savannah. They mainly eat fruit and leaves, although the smaller species, in particular, may also eat some small insects. They have the dental formula: 

Females give birth to a single infant (or, rarely, twins) after a gestation period of 180 to 225 days. In most species, individuals give birth every one to three years, and there is little, if any, seasonal peak in the number of births.

Atelid monkeys are typically polygamous, and live in social groups with anything up to twenty five adults, depending on species. Where groups are relatively small, as is common amongst the howler monkeys, a single male monopolises a 'harem' of females, but larger groups will contain several males, with a clear hierarchy of dominance.

Classification
Currently, 26 species of extant atelid monkey are recognized, grouped into four genera, and two subfamilies. In addition, a number of extinct species from the fossil record have been identified as being within or closely related to this family.

Family Atelidae
Subfamily Alouattinae
Genus Alouatta, howler monkeys
Alouatta palliata group
Coiba Island howler, Alouatta coibensis
Mantled howler, Alouatta palliata
Guatemalan black howler, Alouatta pigra
Alouatta seniculus group 
Ursine howler, Alouatta arctoidea
Red-handed howler, Alouatta belzebul
Spix's red-handed howler, Alouatta discolor
Brown howler, Alouatta guariba
Juruá red howler, Alouatta juara
Guyanan red howler, Alouatta macconnelli
Amazon black howler, Alouatta nigerrima
Purus red howler, Alouatta puruensis
Bolivian red howler, Alouatta sara
Venezuelan red howler, Alouatta seniculus
Maranhão red-handed howler, Alouatta ululata
Alouatta caraya group 
Black howler, Alouatta caraya
Incertae sedis
†Alouatta mauroi (Late Pleistocene)
Genus †Cartelles
†Cartelles coimbrafilhoi (Late Pleistocene)
Genus †Paralouatta, Cuban monkeys
†Paralouatta varonai
†Paralouatta marianae
Genus †Stirtonia
†Stirtonia tatacoensis
†Stirtonia victoriae

Subfamily Atelinae
Genus Ateles, spider monkeys
Red-faced spider monkey, Ateles paniscus
White-fronted spider monkey, Ateles belzebuth
Peruvian spider monkey, Ateles chamek
Brown spider monkey, Ateles hybridus
White-cheeked spider monkey,  Ateles marginatus
Black-headed spider monkey, Ateles fusciceps 
Geoffroy's spider monkey, Ateles geoffroyi
Genus Brachyteles, muriquis (woolly spider monkeys)
Southern muriqui, Brachyteles arachnoides
Northern muriqui, Brachyteles hypoxanthus
Genus Lagothrix, woolly monkeys
Common woolly monkey, Lagothrix lagotricha
Yellow-tailed woolly monkey, Lagothrix flavicauda
Genus †Caipora
†Caipora bambuiorum (Late Pleistocene)
Genus †Protopithecus
†Protopithecus brasiliensis (Late Pleistocene)
Genus †Solimoea
†Solimoea acrensis (Late Miocene)
Subfamily Incertae sedis
Genus †Chilecebus
†Chilecebus carrascoensis (Early Miocene)
Genus †Mohanamico
†Mohanamico hershkovitzi (Middle Miocene)

Silvestro etal 2017 showed the relationship among the extinct and extant atelid genera:

References

External links

https://web.archive.org/web/20051211200906/http://anthro.palomar.edu/primate/prim_5.htm
https://web.archive.org/web/20051224182239/http://csm.jmu.edu/biology/wunderre/julie_web/family_atelidae.htm

New World monkeys
Primate families
Taxa named by John Edward Gray
Extant Miocene first appearances
Taxa described in 1825